Moses Martin Kurong (born 7 July 1994) is a Ugandan long-distance runner.

He represented Uganda at the 2016 Summer Olympics in Rio de Janeiro, in the men's 10,000 metres.

References

1994 births
Living people
Ugandan male long-distance runners
Olympic athletes of Uganda
Athletes (track and field) at the 2016 Summer Olympics
World Athletics Championships athletes for Uganda
21st-century Ugandan people